Argola is an unincorporated community in Lewis County, in the U.S. state of Missouri.

History
A post office called Argola was established in 1879, and remained in operation until 1901. The community's name is a corruption of Ogolar, the surname of a pair of settlers.

References

Unincorporated communities in Lewis County, Missouri
Unincorporated communities in Missouri